Vinko Kos (10 July 1914 – May 1945) was a Croatian author, poet and children's writer.

Biography 

Vinko Kos was born in Vučetinec, a village in the parish of Sveti Juraj na Bregu in the Austro-Hungarian Kingdom of Croatia-Slavonia on 10 July 1914, to Petar Kos and his wife Ana (née Bistrović). Vinko's mother died in 1942 of tuberculosis and his father died in 1945.

He went to primary school to his village and continued his schooling thanks to Stjepan Horvat, a poet from Sveti Juraj na Bregu. Horvat helped him because Vinko was talented, but also very poor. Kos attended Varaždin Franciscan Gymnasium and Diocesan Seminary in Škofja Loka.

He leaves studies in 1936 and in 1937 starts writing for newspaper such as Luč, Hrvatska prosvjeta, Hrvatska revija, Hrvatska straža, Hrvatsko jedinstvo, Obitelj, Glasnik sv. Ante, Hrvatska smotra, Hrvatski ženski list, Omladina, Seljačka omladina, Jutarnji list, Morgenblatt, Plava revija, Danica, Hrvatska mladost, Hrvatska misao, Hrvatski godišnjak and many others.

Kos was associate of Blessed Alojzije Stepinac. On his suggestion, Kos opened Dječji grad, an educational institution for pre-school children. In 1945, Kos left Zagreb in the Independent State of Croatia evacuation to Austria, but died of typhoid fever in a village near Klagenfurt.

List of works 
Vodopad (1939)
Kipar (1941)
Božićne zvjezdice (1941) 
Zlatna jabuka (1942)
Dušenka (1943)
Šišmiš (1943)
Divlji dječak (1943)
Lada (1944) - Winner of The City of Zagreb Award in 1945
Planinski dječak (1945)
Zlatni orasi (published after his death in Toronto in 1967, by Lucijan Kordić)
Sabrana djela 1-2 (Čakovec, 1997)

Composed songs 
 Dom (Jakov Gotovac)
  Mura voda teče (Krsto Odak)
 Cmreki v snegu spiju (I. Sokač)
 Ljubav (Lada Kos)
 Veter (Lada Kos)

References

External links 

Vinko Kos

Croatian male poets
Croatian children's writers
20th-century Croatian poets
1914 births
1945 deaths
Yugoslav writers
People killed by Yugoslav Partisans
Croatian civilians killed in World War II